Eudiagogus is a genus in the beetle family Curculionidae. They are commonly known as sesbania clown weevils, in reference to the fact that they eat plants of the genus Sesbania. There are about five described species in Eudiagogus.

Species
These five species belong to the genus Eudiagogus:
 Eudiagogus episcopalis (Gyllenhal, 1834) c g
 Eudiagogus maryae Warner, 1979 i c g b
 Eudiagogus pallidevittatus Lucas, 1857 c g
 Eudiagogus pulcher Fahraeus, 1840 i c g b (sesbania clown weevil)
 Eudiagogus rosenschoeldi Fahraeus, 1840 i c g b
Data sources: i = ITIS, c = Catalogue of Life, g = GBIF, b = Bugguide.net

References

Further reading

 
 
 
 

Entiminae
Articles created by Qbugbot